Harvey Jack Nicholas Macadam (born 9 January 2001) is an English professional footballer who plays for Fleetwood Town, as a midfielder.

Career

Early career
Macadam was born in Burnley, Lancashire, and attended Blessed Trinity Roman Catholic College in the town. He was first spotted by his hometown club Burnley whilst playing for Fulledge Colts when he was kicking a ball around the side of the pitch whilst watching his older brother Ewan playing, aged eight or nine. Burnley invited him down for a trial and he subsequently signed for the club. He was released after a nearly at the club and he went back to playing for Fulledge Colts. Within a month Manchester City, Everton and local rivals Blackburn Rovers came in for him, with him signing for the latter due to logistical reasons. He played at right back or right-wing back for five or six years before he was released by the club at the age of sixteen, failing to earn a scholarship. His father, Nick, believes it was due to his size, as he was only about 5 ft 9ins tall, which made him appear younger than he was. Macadam was instead offered a two-year scholarship at non-league National League side AFC Fylde after trials at Blackpool and Bury. Macadam featured for the under-18 side and was sent out on loan to North West Counties Football League Division One North side Nelson in November 2018 to gain some experience of men's football. He had a further setback when he was not offered a professional deal at the end of his scholarship, due to the Coasters losing the 2019 National League play-off Final to Salford City in May 2019, and he was subsequently released for financial reasons.

Non-league
Following on from his release from AFC Fylde, he signed for Steve Wilkes at North West Counties Football League Premier Division side Northwich Victoria for the 2019–20 campaign. After not playing for a couple of months and Nelson manager, Andy Harrison, had taken a shine to him in his earlier loan spell, so offered him the chance to drop down a division and come to the club for the second half of the season and play. The move was successful and he won the Players' Player and Manager's Player of the Season along with being the second-highest goalscorer. In February 2020, he left Nelson to step-up three divisions to sign for Northern Premier League Premier Division side Ashton United, as Harrison was good friends with manager Michael Clegg, stating that he was too good to be playing in the NWCFL Division One. He only played a couple of games for the Robins before COVID struck and the league was firstly suspended before being declared null and void. In September 2020, it was announced that he had signed permanently for North West Counties Premier Division side Longridge Town, having impressed in pre-season in training and in trial games. He was a part of the side that had a record breaking run in the FA Cup for Longridge, reaching the third  qualifying round for the first time. Macadam re-joined Clegg at Ashton in October 2020 and made five appearances, scoring against York City in the FA Trophy, before the season was again curtailed due to Covid. He committed again for Ashton United for the 2021–22 season in the Northern Premier League, becoming a regular in the side, drawing interest from EFL League One side Fleetwood Town in October 2021.

Fleetwood Town
On 2 January 2022, he signed for Fleetwood Town for an undisclosed fee on a two-and-a-half year deal, signing his first ever professional contract. He scored his first goal for the club, on his full debut, on 2 April 2022.

Career statistics

References

2001 births
Living people
English footballers
Burnley F.C. players
AFC Fylde players
Northwich Victoria F.C. players
Nelson F.C. players
Ashton United F.C. players
Longridge Town F.C. players
Fleetwood Town F.C. players
English Football League players
Northern Premier League players
North West Counties Football League players
Association football midfielders
Blackburn Rovers F.C. players